Garwin Sanford (born 14 March 1955) is a Canadian film and television actor known for his roles on Stargate SG-1 and Stargate Atlantis.

Career 
Sanford's most notable roles are Narim in Stargate SG-1 and Simon Wallace in Stargate Atlantis. In 1994, he played Captain Taylor Shields in the historical adventure series Hawkeye. Sanford has also made guest appearances on such television series as Smallville, Airwolf, North of 60, MacGyver, Stingray, Booker, Sliders, Dead Man's Gun, Highlander: The Series, Merlin's Apprentice, The Odyssey, The Outer Limits, Earth: Final Conflict, Dark Angel, The 4400, Eureka, So Weird and Supernatural. He appeared in Another Cinderella Story as Rod Parker, Joey's father.  He has also appeared in several Bryan Adams music videos.

In 2005 Sanford appeared in Recipe for a Perfect Christmas (aka Smothered) as Clay McNeil, JJ's Boss. The following year Sanford appeared in Merlin's Apprentice as Lord Weston.

In 2013, Sanford appeared as the Red King in Once Upon a Time in Wonderland and as Vice President Brubaker in Independence Daysaster. Sanford has also had guest roles on Cedar Cove as Colin McFadden and When Calls the Heart as William Thatcher.

Sanford is also an artist, specializing in pen and ink portraiture and sculpture.

In 2015 Sanford was the recipient of the Sam Payne Award, an award given to a B.C. artist who demonstrates humanity, integrity and the encouragement of new talent.

Filmography 
Below is an incomplete filmography:

References

External links 
 

1955 births
Canadian people of British descent
Canadian male television actors
Living people
People from Truro, Nova Scotia
Male actors from Nova Scotia